The Jalandhar–Firozpur line is a railway line connecting  and , both in the Indian state of the Punjab. The line is under the administrative jurisdiction of Northern Railway.

History
The Jalandhar–Firozpur line was laid in 1912.
The last official steam service on the line completed its journey on 6 December 1995.

Border crossings
Fazilka and Hussainiwala on this line are two defunct railway border crossing points on the India–Pakistan border. After partition of India, a  line linked Amruka on the Pakistan side of the India–Pakistan border, opposite Fazilka, towards Samma Satta. The Hussainiwala–Ganda Singh Wala railway crossing, near Firozpur, became defunct with the partition of India. The  broad gauge line from Kasur Junction in Pakistan has been closed. A strategically important  Kaiser-E-Hind Rail cum Road Bridge was blown up during the Indo-Pakistani War of 1971 at Hussainiwala, and was never rebuilt. In 2013, Sutlej Barrage Bridge on Hussainiwala was opened after restructuring.

Passenger movement
Jalandhar City is the only station on this line that is amongst the top hundred booking stations of Indian Railway.

Rail Coach Factory
Rail Coach Factory, Kapurthala started production in 1988. It is the largest and most modern coach manufacturing unit of Indian Railways, producing around 1,600 coaches annually.

References

External links
Trains at Jalandhar City
Firozpur Cantonment

5 ft 6 in gauge railways in India
Rail transport in Punjab, India

Railway lines opened in 1912
1912 establishments in India
Transport in Firozpur
Transport in Jalandhar